Giannis Satsias (born 28 December 2002) is a Cypriot professional footballer who plays as a midfielder for Cypriot First Division club APOEL.

Club career
Satsias made his professional debut for APOEL in the Cypriot First Division on 21 August 2020, coming on as a substitute in the 59th minute for Marius Lundemo in the home match against Karmiotissa, which finished as a 2–2 draw.he scored his first goal for APOEL in a game against Pafos fc making it 1-3 for APOEL

Personal
His father is the former APOEL footballer Marinos Satsias.

Career statistics

References

External links
 
 
 

2002 births
Living people
Cypriot footballers
Cyprus youth international footballers
Association football midfielders
APOEL FC players
Cypriot First Division players